Seneca is the name of some places in the U.S. state of Wisconsin:

Seneca, Crawford County, Wisconsin, a town
Seneca (community), Crawford County, Wisconsin, an unincorporated community
Seneca, Green Lake County, Wisconsin, a town
Seneca, Shawano County, Wisconsin, a town
Seneca, Wood County, Wisconsin, a town